The Speaker of Toronto City Council chairs meetings of Toronto City Council. With the written consent of the Mayor, the Speaker and a Deputy Speaker are elected by Toronto City Council from among its members.

While municipal council meetings in Ontario are traditionally chaired by the head of Council (e.g. Mayor, Warden, Reeve or Regional Chair), the City of Toronto Act allows Toronto Council to appoint another member as a presiding officer. Toronto Council has opted to use this provision and the election of presiding officers with the titles Speaker and Deputy Speaker is authorized by s. 27-6.4 of the Council Procedures.

Unlike "Speakers" in parliamentary assemblies, the Council Speaker has no other duties outside of presiding over meetings.  The Mayor is considered to be the Chair of Council for all other purposes.  The Speaker does not earn any additional salary for the position.  The Speaker is precluded from serving as chair of a committee, the Toronto Transit Commission or the Toronto Police Services Board.

The position was recommended by the council-appointed three-member volunteer advisory panel and its report "The City We Want – the Government We Need" in 2005. Before recommendations from the report was accepted, the mayor was the presiding officer during council meetings.

The mayor retains the right to chair city council meetings and can take the chair at any time. However, in practice, this is reserved for ceremonial or other significant occasions, and the speaker and deputy speaker normally preside.

In the absence of the speaker or deputy speaker, the deputy mayor can also preside over a meeting of city council. The speaker and deputy speaker are elected for a four-year term and can only be removed by a two-thirds vote of city council.

Speakers of Toronto City Council

Deputy speakers of Toronto City Council

References

External links
 Implementation of New Council Governance Model for the Term of Council

Toronto City Counsel, Speaker of
Municipal government of Toronto
Toronto-related lists
Speakers of city councils
2006 establishments in Ontario